Swatragh is a small village and townland in County Londonderry, Northern Ireland. Swatragh is on the main A29 road north of Maghera, and is situated within Mid-Ulster District. The population was 438 in the 2011 Census. 
The village has three churches: one Roman Catholic, one Church of Ireland, and one Presbyterian. The Catholic and Church of Ireland churches are listed buildings. St John's is the local primary school.

Swatragh's name in Irish, an Suaitreach, is derived from a shortened form of Baile an tSuaitrigh meaning "townland of the billeted soldier".

Sport 
Swatragh is home to Michael Davitt Gaelic Athletic Club. Several of the club's Gaelic football players have represented Derry GAA.

There is also a boxing club located within the village.

People
 Anthony Tohill - Gaelic footballer
 Terry McFlynn - professional association football player

Rivers 
The Knockoneil River flows through the village and is leased by the Clady And District Angling Club. The rivers best access is mainly downstream from the Swatragh Bridge downstream towards Beagh Bridge. The river can also be easy fished so far upstream about a fields length before becoming wild and overgrown Brown trout is plentiful along this stretch of the river as well as late Salmon and Bann Trout. The Knockoneil is an artery of the Clady River along with the Grillagh River.

References 

NI Neighbourhood Information Service
NI population of settlements estimates from 2011 census
Draft Magherafelt Area Plan 2015
Culture Northern Ireland

Villages in County Londonderry
Mid-Ulster District